The 2016–17 season is the 85th season in Real Zaragoza ’s history and the 20th in the second-tier.

Squad

Competitions

Overall

Liga

League table

Copa del Rey

References

Real Zaragoza seasons
Real Zaragoza